Litice nad Orlicí is a village and administrative part of Záchlumí in Ústí nad Orlicí District in the Pardubice Region of the Czech Republic.

History of the village is bound together with the history of Litice Castle.

References

Neighbourhoods in the Czech Republic
Villages in Ústí nad Orlicí District